The Very Best of The Commodores is the seventh compilation album by American funk/soul band Commodores, released in 1995 on Motown Records. The album charted at No. 26 on the UK Pop Albums chart and at No. 39 on the New Zealand Pop Albums chart. The album has been certified Silver in the UK by the BPI.

Track listing 
 Easy (Lionel Richie) from the album Commodores 1977 – 4:22
 Three Times A Lady (Lionel Richie) from the album Natural High 1978 – 3:38
 Nightshift (Walter Orange, Dennis Lambert, Franne Golde) from the album Nightshift 1985 – 4:24
 Brick House (Shirley Hanna-King, Lionel Richie, Milan Williams, Walter Orange, Ronald La Pread, Thomas McClary, William King) from the album Commodores – 3:35
 Machine Gun (Milan Williams) from the album Machine Gun 1974 – 2:42
 Zoom (Lionel Richie, Ronald LaPread) from the album Commodores – 4:22
 Old-Fashion Love (Milan Williams) from the album Heroes 1980 – 3:25
 Sail On (Lionel Richie) from the album Midnight Magic 1979 – 3:58 
 Lady (You Bring Me Up) (Harold Hudson, William King, Shirley Hanna-King) from the album In the Pocket 1981 – 4:04
 Oh No (Lionel Richie) from the album In the Pocket – 3:03
 Too Hot Ta Trot (William King, Ronald LaPread, Thomas McClary, Walter Orange, Lionel Richie, Milan Williams) from the album Commodores Live! 1977 – 3:33
 The Zoo (The Human Zoo) (Gloria Jones, Pam Sawyer) from the album Machine Gun – 3:08
 Still (Lionel Richie) from the album Midnight Magic – 3:46
 Sweet Love (Lionel Richie) from the album Movin' On 1975 – 3:29
 Janet (Bobby Caldwell, Franne Golde, Paul Fox) from the album Nightshift – 3:43
 Flying High (Lionel Richie, Thomas McClary) from the album Natural High – 3:55
 Only You (Milan Williams) from the album Commodores 13 1983 – 4:29
 Animal Instinct (Martin Page) from the album Nightshift – 4:06
 Just To Be Close To You (Lionel Richie) from the album Hot on the Tracks 1976 – 3:23
 Wonderland (Milan Williams) from the album Midnight Magic – 3:48

Personnel 
 Lionel Richie – vocals, saxophone, keyboards
 Thomas McClary – vocals, guitar
 Milan Williams – keyboards
 Ronald LaPread – bass guitar
 William King – trumpet
 Walter Orange – drums, vocals, percussion

References 

Commodores albums
albums produced by James Anthony Carmichael
Motown compilation albums
1995 compilation albums